Edmond Verbruggen (15 March 1882 – 9 April 1949) was a Belgian footballer. He played in one match for the Belgium national football team in 1910.

References

External links
 

1882 births
1949 deaths
Belgian footballers
Belgium international footballers
Place of birth missing
Association football midfielders